Karaca Island is an Aegean island of Turkey.

Karaca island is named after the village facing the island. At  it is administratively a part of Marmaris ilçe (district) of Muğla Province. . Famous Sedir Island is to the north of Karaca Island.

The island belongs to a Turkish family. Recently, the owners  put the island on the market. But the island is an archaeological site and there are serious objections against this sale.

References

Aegean islands
Islands of Turkey
Islands of Muğla Province
Marmaris District